Erin Dignam (born July 20, 1955) is an American film director, screenwriter and former professional tennis player.

A native of California, Dignam qualified for the singles main draw of the 1977 Wimbledon Championships.

Dignam directed and wrote the films Denial (1990) and Loved (1997), both starring actress Robin Wright. The 2021 film Land, which is Wright's  directorial debut, is from a screenplay co-written by Dignam. She has also written the screenplay for the films The Yellow Handkerchief (2008) and Submergence (2017).

References

External links
 
 
 

1955 births
Living people
American female tennis players
Tennis people from California
American women film directors
American women screenwriters